The 1994–95 season of the Norwegian Premier League, the highest bandy league for men in Norway.

Ten games were played, with 2 points given for wins and 1 for draws. Solberg won the league. Sarpsborg was relegated, and as Strømsgodset disappeared as the league shrank with one team ahead of the next season.

League table

References

Seasons in Norwegian bandy
1994 in bandy
1995 in bandy
Band
Band